Ben Hansbrough (born December 23, 1987) is an American former professional basketball player and a former assistant coach for Western Kentucky University. He resigned from WKU on October 16, 2017.  He is the younger brother of former NBA player Tyler Hansbrough.

College career
Hansbrough began his career at Mississippi State University and was a standout for two seasons before transferring to Notre Dame. Hansbrough, who is 6'3" and weighs  averaged 12.0 points per game during his career at Notre Dame. In his final season at Notre Dame, Hansbrough averaged 18.4 points and 4.3 assists per game, and was named to the All-Big East team; he was the lone unanimous pick for it. He also was chosen as the 2010–11 Big East Player of the Year. He was picked to the Second Team All-America by Fox Sports.

Professional career
On June 27, 2011 he signed a one-year contract with Bayern Munich in Germany. During his time in Germany, he struggled to get playing time and was released on December 23. Not long after being released, he signed with Krka Novo Mesto of Slovenia. In January 2012, he left Krka Novo Mesto due to personal reasons on his part.

He played for the Indiana Pacers in the 2012 Orlando Summer League, where in 5 games he averaged 6.0ppg, 1.6apg, 1.0rpg. On September 18, 2012, he signed a non-guaranteed contract with the Pacers for the 2012–13 NBA season, joining his brother Tyler.  Hansbrough played in 28 games for the Pacers that season, averaging 2.0 points and 0.8 assists.

In August 2013, he signed a one-year deal with Gran Canaria.

On September 26, 2014, he signed with the Chicago Bulls. However, he was later waived by the Bulls on October 18, 2014. On November 1, 2014, he was selected by the Grand Rapids Drive with the fifth overall pick in the 2014 NBA Development League Draft. On December 9, 2014, he was waived by the Drive per his request. On December 29, 2014, he signed with Laboral Kutxa Baskonia of Spain for the rest of the season.

Post-playing career
On August 24, 2015, Western Kentucky announced Hansbrough had joined their staff as Coordinator of Player Development. On June 19, 2017, he was promoted to assistant coach for the 2017-18 season.

Hansbrough announced his resignation from WKU in October 2017.

In 2019 Hansbrough co-founded a Real Estate Development company named Oliver and Hansbrough Development LLC located in Alvaton, Kentucky

Career statistics

NBA

Regular season

|-
| align="left" | 
| align="left" | Indiana
| 28 || 0 || 7.1 || .333 || .261 || .778 || .6 || 1.0 || .3 || .1 || 2.0

Playoffs

|-
| align="left" | 2013
| align="left" | Indiana
| 6 || 0 || 3.7 || .000 || .000 || – || .5 || .5 || .0 || .2 || .0

Euroleague

|-
| style="text-align:left;"| 2014–15
| style="text-align:left;"| Laboral Kutxa
| 12 || 1 || 12.4 || .323 || .273 || .500 || 1.4 || 0.8 || 0.4 || 0.0 || 2.3 || 0.8
|- class="sortbottom"
| style="text-align:center;" colspan="2"| Career
| 12 || 1 || 12.4 || .323 || .273 || .500 || 1.4 || 0.8 || 0.4 || 0.0 || 2.3 || 0.8

See also

References

External links

 Ben Hansbrough at eurobasket.com
 Ben Hansbrough at euroleague.net
 

1987 births
Living people
All-American college men's basketball players
American expatriate basketball people in Germany
American expatriate basketball people in Slovenia
American expatriate basketball people in Spain
American men's basketball players
Basketball players from Missouri
CB Gran Canaria players
FC Bayern Munich basketball players
Grand Rapids Drive players
Indiana Pacers players
KK Krka players
Liga ACB players
Mississippi State Bulldogs men's basketball players
Notre Dame Fighting Irish men's basketball players
People from Poplar Bluff, Missouri
Point guards
Saski Baskonia players
Shooting guards
Undrafted National Basketball Association players